This is a list of museums in Niger.

List 

 Musée National Boubou Hama, Niamey
 Musée Régional de Dosso
 Musée Régional de Zinder

See also 

 List of museums

External links 
 Museums in Niger

 
Niger
Museums
Museums
Museums
Niger